Kiki Bertens and Demi Schuurs were the defending champions but lost in the first round to Kristina Mladenovic and Galina Voskoboeva.

Nicole Melichar and Květa Peschke won the title, defeating Chan Hao-ching and Latisha Chan in the final, 6–1, 6–1.

Seeds

Draw

Draw

References
Main Draw

Brisbane International - Doubles
2019 Brisbane International